Yuhui Choe is a Korean ballet dancer. She is a first soloist at The Royal Ballet.

Early life
Choe was born in Fukuoka, Japan. Choe started ballet training at the age of five. At the age of 14, Choe left her family and moved the Paris to train with Daini Kudo and later Dominique Khalfouni. She stated one of the reason why she chose Paris is because Élisabeth Platel was her idol.

Career
In 2002, Choe joined The Royal Ballet as an apprentice after she won first prize and the contemporary dance prize at the Prix de Lausanne. She became an Artist the following year. In 2004, she danced her first solo role, as Princess Florine in The Sleeping Beauty. She was named First Artist in 2006 and First Soloist in 2008. Two of her first roles as First Soloist are Nikiya in La Bayadère and Sugar Plum Fairy in The Nutcracker, and she was one of six women chosen to create roles in Wayne McGregor's Infra. She has also danced roles in The Two Pigeons, Don Quixote and Elite Syncopation. Choe also frequently works with Jonathan Watkins.

In 2009, The Guardian chose Choe as the dancer on their "hotlist" of rising stars to watch, quoting Lauren Cuthbertson, "I can't take my eyes off her. She radiates joy in the purest sense".

In 2014, Choe had to replace the injured Natalia Osipova at short notice as Princess Aurora, her debut in the lead role in Sleeping Beauty. Osipova's appearance was eagerly anticipated. The Guardian noted that Choe "appeared radiantly unfazed by the challenge" and that "Choe should be promoted to principal now".

Selected repertoire 
Choe's repertoire with the Royal Ballet includes:

Awards
2000 Paris International Dance Competition - silver
2002 Prix de Lausanne - first prize and the contemporary dance prize
2008 Critics’ Circle National Dance Award - Best Female Artist (Classical)
2016 Asian Women of Achievement Awards (Arts and Culture) - nominated

Personal life
Choe is married to Nehemiah Kish, a former Principal Dancer at The Royal Ballet.

References

South Korean ballerinas
Dancers of The Royal Ballet
Living people
1986 births
21st-century ballet dancers
People from Fukuoka
South Korean expatriates in France
South Korean expatriates in England